David Heywood Swartz (born March 3, 1942) is an American former diplomat who served as the U.S. Ambassador to Belarus, after having served as Charge ́ d’Affaires. 

Heywood was born in Chicago, Illinois on March 3, 1942. He graduated from Southwestern College (B.A., 1964) and Florida State University (M.A., 1966) and Canadian Defense College in Kingston, Ontario, Canada (1982–1983).

When he was appointed Ambassador in 1992, it was “a new position.”  Swartz served until 1994.  Swartz “resigned ...his post ... in protest against the Clinton administration's coddling of the Minsk regime.“ He previously served as dean of the School of Language Studies at the Foreign Service Institute (1989–91), staff director at the Nuclear Risk Reduction Center (1988–89) and consul general in Calgary, Alberta, Canada (1983–84) and in Zurich, Switzerland (1980– 82).

References

1942 births
Living people
People from Chicago
Ambassadors of the United States to Belarus
Florida State University alumni
American consuls